Underground Lovers is the debut album by Australian indie rock/electronic band Underground Lovers, released in March 1991. The album was released in the UK under the title "Get To Notice".

"Looking for Rain" (April 1991) and "Lick the Boot" (August 1991) were lifted from the album as singles; "Lick the Boot" was also the band's first release in the UK. The band won the 1992 ARIA Award for Best New Artist.

Track listing
(All music by Underground Lovers, all lyrics by Vincent Giarrusso)
"Get to Notice" – 4:45
"Yes I Do" – 1:44
"She Draws Circles" – 4:37
"Girl Afraid" – 3:43
"Persistence"  – 4:12
"Wasted"  – 4:06
"Looking For Rain" – 4:37
"Sleep"  – 2:57
"Lick the Boot" – 4:00
"My American Accent" – 3:42

Personnel

Glenn Bennie – guitars, drums 
Vincent Giarrusso – vocals
Maurice Argiro — bass
Philippa Nihill — vocals
Richard Andrew — drums

References

1991 albums
ARIA Award-winning albums
Underground Lovers albums